Sagres may refer to:

Places
 Sagres (Vila do Bispo), a civil parish in the municipality of Vila do Bispo, Portugal
 Sagres Point, a promontory in the southwestern part of Vila do Bispo, Portugal
 Lighthouse of Ponta de Sagres
 Sagres, São Paulo, a municipality in the state of São Paulo, Brazil

Other
 Escola de Sagres, a nautical school that would have existed in the civil parish of Sagres, Portugal, during the fifteenth century
 NRP Sagres (1896), a tall ship in Portuguese naval service also known as Sagres II, and now Rickmer Rickmers
 NRP Sagres (1937), a tall ship in Portuguese naval service also known as Sagres III
 Sagres (beer), a Portuguese brewery, founded in 1934
 "Sagres" (song), the first single from the album Dark Bird Is Home by Swedish artist The Tallest Man on Earth

See also
 Sgares (born 1988), American professional Counter-Strike: Global Offensive player